Bjärby  is a village in Karlskrona Municipality, Blekinge County, southeastern Sweden.

History
The settlement has existed since at least the mid-19th century, being mentioned in an 1861 almanac as part of the estate of Peter Adolph Werner.

Geography
According to the 2000 census it had a population of 56 people.

References

Populated places in Karlskrona Municipality